Juan Carlos Duque Gancedo (born 26 January 1982 in Madrid) is a Spanish retired footballer who played as a defender, and a current manager.

Honours
Spain U16
UEFA European Under-16 Football Championship: 1999

External links

1982 births
Living people
Footballers from Madrid
Spanish footballers
Association football defenders
Segunda División players
Segunda División B players
Real Madrid C footballers
Real Madrid Castilla footballers
Zamora CF footballers
Pontevedra CF footballers
AD Ceuta footballers
Polideportivo Ejido footballers
UD San Sebastián de los Reyes players
Spain youth international footballers
Spanish football managers